Groundhog Day (Nova Scotia: Daks Day) is a popular North American tradition observed in the United States and Canada on February 2 of every year starting in the 16th century. It derives from the Pennsylvania Dutch superstition that if a groundhog emerges from its burrow on this day and sees its shadow, it will retreat to its den and winter will go on for six more weeks; if it does not see its shadow, spring will arrive early. This is often due to the weather being cloudy or clear allowing for the groundhog to actually have a shadow or not. 

While the tradition remains popular in the 21st century, studies have found no consistent association between a groundhog seeing its shadow and the subsequent arrival time of spring-like weather.

The weather lore was brought from German-speaking areas where the badger is the forecasting animal. This appears to be an enhanced version of the lore that clear weather on the Christian festival of Candlemas forebodes a prolonged winter.

The Groundhog Day ceremony held at Punxsutawney in western Pennsylvania, centering on a semi-mythical groundhog named Punxsutawney Phil, has become the most frequently attended ceremony.  Grundsow Lodges in Pennsylvania Dutch Country in the southeastern part of the state observe the occasion as well. Other cities in the United States and Canada also have adopted the event.

History

Origins
The Pennsylvania Dutch were immigrants from German-speaking areas of Europe. The Germans had a tradition of marking Candlemas (February 2) as "Badger Day" (Dachstag), on which if a badger emerging from its den encountered a sunny day, thereby casting a shadow, it presaged four more weeks of winter.

Germany
Candlemas is a primarily Catholic festival but also known in the German Protestant (Lutheran) churches. In folk religion, various traditions and superstitions continue to be linked with the holiday, although this was discouraged by the Protestant Reformers in the 16th century. Notably, several traditions that are part of weather lore use the weather at Candlemas to predict the start of spring.

The weather-predicting animal on Candlemas usually was the badger, although regionally, the animal was the bear or the fox. The original weather-predicting animal in Germany had been the bear, another hibernating mammal, but when they grew scarce, the lore became altered.

Similarity to the groundhog lore has been noted for the German formula: Sonnt sich der Dachs in der Lichtmeßwoche, so geht er auf vier Wochen wieder zu Loche ("If the badger sunbathes during Candlemas-week, for four more weeks he will be back in his hole"). A slight variant is found in a collection of weather lore (Bauernregeln, lit. "farmers' rules") printed in Austria in 1823.

Groundhog as badger
The Pennsylvanians maintained the same tradition as the Germans on Groundhog Day, except that winter's spell would be prolonged for six weeks instead of four. For the Pennsylvania Dutch, the badger became the dox, which in Deitsch referred to "groundhog".

The standard term for "groundhog" was grun'daks (from German dachs), with the regional variant in York County being grundsau, a direct translation of the English name, according to a 19th-century book on the dialect. The form was a regional variant according to one 19th-century source. However, the weather superstition that begins Der zwet Hær'ning is Grund'sau dåk. Wânn di grundsau îr schâtte sent... ("February second is Groundhog day. If the groundhog sees its shadow...") is given as common to all fourteen counties in Dutch Pennsylvania Country, in a 1915 monograph.

In The Thomas R. Brendle Collection of Pennsylvania German Folklore, Brendle preserved the following lore from the local Pennsylvania German dialect:
Wann der Dachs sei Schadde seht im Lichtmess Marye, dann geht er widder in's Loch un beleibt noch sechs Woche drin. Wann Lichtmess Marye awwer drieb is, dann bleibt der dachs haus un's watt noch enanner Friehyaahr. (When the groundhog sees his shadow on the morning of Mary Candlemas, he will again go into his hole and remain there for six weeks. But if the morning of Mary Candlemas is overcast, the groundhog will remain outside and there will be another spring.)
The form grundsow has been used by the lodge in Allentown and elsewhere. Brendle also recorded the name "Grundsaudag" (Groundhog day in Lebanon County) and "Daxdaag" (Groundhog day in Northampton County).

Victor Hugo, in "Les Misérables," (1864) discusses the day as follows:

"...it was the second of February, that ancient Candlemas-day whose treacherous sun, the precursor of six weeks of cold, inspired Matthew Laensberg with the two lines, which have deservedly become classic:

'Qu'il luise ou qu'il luiserne,
L'ours rentre en sa caverne.'

(Let it gleam or let it glimmer,
The bear goes back into his cave.)"

– Hugo, Victor. "Les Misérables." Trans. Fahnestock and MacAfee, based on Wilbour. Signet Classics, NY, 1987. p. 725.

Bear-rat
The groundhog was once also known by the obsolete Latin alias Arctomys monax. The genus name signified "bear-rat". The European marmot is of the same genus and was formerly called Arctomys alpinus. It was speculated that the European counterpart might have lore similar to the groundhog attached to it.

Simpler Candlemas lore

The German version, with the introduction of the badger (or other beasts), was an expansion of a simpler tradition that if the weather was sunny and clear on Candlemas Day, people expected winter to continue. The simpler version is summarized in the English (Scots dialect) couplet that runs "If Candlemas is fair and clear / There'll be  winters in the year", with equivalent phrases in French and German. And the existence of a corresponding Latin couplet has been suggested as evidence of the great antiquity of this tradition.

The use of candles on the Christian Candlemas was inspired by the Roman rite for the goddess Februa, in which a procession of candles was done on February 2, according to Yoder. The Roman calendar, in turn, had Celtic origins. Candlemas concurs with Imbolc, one of the Celtic 'cross-quarter days', the four days which marked the midpoints between solstice and equinox.

British and Gaelic calendars
Scholar Rhys Carpenter in 1946 emphasized that the Badger Day tradition was strong in Germany, but absent in the British Isles, and he referred to this as a reason that the U.S. Groundhog Day was not brought by immigrants from these places.

There did exist a belief among Roman Catholics in Britain that the hedgehog predicted the length of winter, or so it has been claimed, but without demonstration of its age, in a publication by the Scotland-born American journalist Thomas C. MacMillan in 1886, and American writer/journalist Samuel Adams Drake's book published in 1900.

In the Gaelic calendar of Ireland, Scotland, and the Isle of Man, Brigid's Day (February 1) is a day for predicting the weather. While in Scotland the animal that heralds spring on this day is a snake, and on the Isle of Man a large bird, in Ireland folklorist Kevin Danaher records lore of hedgehogs being observed for this omen:

Pennsylvania
The observance of Groundhog Day in the United States first occurred in German communities in Pennsylvania, according to known records. The earliest mention of Groundhog Day is an entry on February 2, 1840, in the diary of James L. Morris of Morgantown, in Pennsylvania Dutch Country, according to the book on the subject by Don Yoder. This was a Welsh enclave but the diarist was commenting on his neighbors who were of German stock.

Punxsutawney beginnings
The first reported news of a Groundhog Day observance was arguably made by the Punxsutawney Spirit newspaper of Punxsutawney, Pennsylvania, in 1886: "up to the time of going to press, the beast has not seen its shadow". However, it was not until the following year in 1887 that the first Groundhog Day considered "official" was commemorated there, with a group making a trip to the Gobbler's Knob part of town to consult the groundhog. People have gathered annually at the spot for the event ever since.

Clymer Freas (1867–1942) who was city editor at the Punxsutawney Spirit is credited as the "father" who conceived the idea of "Groundhog Day". It has also been suggested that Punxsutawney was where all the Groundhog Day events originated, from where it spread to other parts of the United States and Canada.

The Groundhog Day celebrations of the 1880s were carried out by the Punxsutawney Elks Lodge. The lodge members were the "genesis" of the Groundhog Club formed later, which continued the Groundhog Day tradition. But the lodge started out being interested in the groundhog as a game animal for food. It had started to serve groundhog at the lodge, and had been organizing a hunting party on a day each year in late summer.

The chronologies given are somewhat inconsistent in the literature. The first "Groundhog Picnic" was held in 1887 according to one source, but given as post-circa-1889 by a local historian in a journal. The historian states that around 1889 the meat was served in the lodge's banquet, and the organized hunt started after that.

Either way, the Punxsutawney Groundhog Club was formed in 1899, and continued the hunt and "Groundhog Feast", which took place annually in September. The "hunt" portion of it became increasingly a ritualized formality, because the practical procurement of meat had to occur well ahead of time for marinating. A drink called the "groundhog punch" was also served. The flavor has been described as a "cross between pork and chicken". The hunt and feast did not attract enough outside interest, and the practice was discontinued.

The groundhog was not named Phil until 1961, possibly as an indirect reference to Prince Philip, Duke of Edinburgh.

Punxsutawney today

The largest Groundhog Day celebration is held in Punxsutawney, Pennsylvania, where crowds as large as 40,000 gather each year (nearly eight times the year-round population of the town). The average draw had been about 2,000 until the 1993 film Groundhog Day, which is set at the festivities in Punxsutawney, after which attendance rose to about 10,000. The official Phil is pretended to be a supercentenarian, having been the same forecasting beast since 1887.

In 2019, the 133rd year of the tradition, the groundhog was summoned to come out at 7:25 am on February 2, but did not see its shadow. Fans of Punxsutawney Phil awaited his arrival starting at 6:00 am, thanks to a live stream provided by Visit Pennsylvania. The live stream has been a tradition for the past several years, allowing more people than ever to watch the animal meteorologist.

2021 was the 135th, and for the first time, much of the Inner Circle members were required to wear a mask. The groundhog was summoned at 7:25 am on February 2 and saw its shadow. Due to the COVID-19 pandemic, the ceremony was held behind closed doors, with no fans allowed to attend.

2022 saw the 136th celebration of the event and the groundhog saw its shadow, predicting six more weeks of winter.

In 2023, during the 137th prognostication event, the groundhog once again saw its shadow, calling for six more weeks of winter.

Regional celebrations

United States
 Mid-Atlantic
The Slumbering Groundhog Lodge, which was formed in 1907, has carried out the ceremonies that take place in Quarryville, Pennsylvania. It used to be a contending rival to Punxsutawney over the Groundhog Day fame. It employs a taxidermic specimen (stuffed woodchuck).

In Southeastern Pennsylvania, Groundhog Lodges (Grundsow Lodges) celebrate the holiday with fersommlinge, social events in which food is served, speeches are made, and one or more g'spiel (plays or skits) are performed for entertainment. The Pennsylvania German dialect is the only language spoken at the event, and those who speak English pay a penalty, usually in the form of a nickel, dime, or quarter per word spoken, with the money put into a bowl in the center of the table.

In Milltown, New Jersey, Milltown Mel was purchased in 2008 in Sunbury, Pennsylvania, by Jerry and Cathy Guthlein, and lived in a cage in the Guthleins' back yard. Mel's first event was at the family business, the Bronson and Guthlein Funeral Home, with later events moved to the American Legion Post, with free coffee and doughnuts served afterwards.  Mel died in 2021.)

Stonewall Jackson predicts at Space Farms Zoo and Museum.

Essex Ed the groundhog and Otis the Hedgehog predict at Turtle Back Zoo.

Great Neck Greta, of Great Neck, Long Island, New York, predicted in 2020.

Quigley, of The Hamptons (resident of the Save the Animals Rescue Foundation), predicts at Quogue Village Fire Department.

Staten Island Chuck is the stage name for the official weather-forecasting woodchuck for New York City, housed in the Staten Island Zoo. In 2009, Chuck bit then-NYC-Mayor Mike Bloomberg, prompting zoo officials to quietly replace him with his daughter Charlotte. In 2014, NYC Mayor Bill de Blasio, famously dropped Charlotte during the ceremony, visibly disturbing many of the children present for the event. Charlotte's untimely death a week later prompted rumors she was killed by the fall, although the zoo later said this was unlikely to be the cause of Charlotte‘s demise. As a result, Bill de Blasio did not participate in the tradition thereafter.

Dunkirk Dave (a stage name for numerous groundhogs that have filled the role since 1960) is the local groundhog for Western New York, handled by Bob Will, a typewriter repairman who runs a rescue shelter for groundhogs. Will is adamant that Dunkirk Dave does not actually predict the date of spring because that is fixed by calendars, but instead predicts the harshness of the remainder of winter.

French Creek Freddie is West Virginia's resident groundhog meteorologist.  A resident of the West Virginia State Wildlife Center in French Creek, West Virginia, Freddie made his debut in 1978, and boasts an accuracy rate of approximately 50%.  On Groundhog Day, 2022, Freddie predicted six more weeks of winter, with the mayor of Buckhannon and members of the community in attendance.

 Midwest
In the Midwest, Sun Prairie, Wisconsin, is the self-proclaimed "Groundhog Capital of the World". This title taken in response to the Punxsutawney Spirit'''s 1952 newspaper article describing Sun Prairie as a "remote two cow village buried somewhere in the wilderness..." In 2015, Jimmy the Groundhog bit the ear of Mayor Jon Freund and the story quickly went viral worldwide. The next day a mayoral proclamation absolved Jimmy XI of any wrongdoing.Buckeye Chuck, Ohio's official State Groundhog, is one of two weather-predicting groundhogs. He resides in Marion, Ohio.Woodstock Willie, in Woodstock, Illinois, the shooting location for the 1993 film Groundhog Day.Concord Casimir, while not a groundhog, is a weather-predicting cat whose forecast is based on how he eats his annual pierogi meal. He resides in Concord, Ohio, on the outskirts of Cleveland.
 The South
In Washington, D.C., the Dupont Circle Groundhog Day event features Potomac Phil, another taxidermic specimen.  From his first appearance in 2012 to 2018, Phil's spring predictions invariably agreed with those of the more lively Punxsutawney Phil, who made his predictions half an hour earlier. In addition, Phil always predicted correctly six more months of political gridlock. However, after being accused of collusion in 2018, Potomac Phil contradicted Punxsutawney Phil in 2019 and, further, predicted two more years of political insanity.Birmingham Bill, at Birmingham Zoo, was "taking a break" from predicting in 2015.

In Raleigh, NC, an annual event at the North Carolina Museum of Natural Sciences includes Sir Walter Wally. According to museum officials, Wally has been correct 58% of the time vs. Punxsutawney Phil's 39%.

Elsewhere in the American South, the General Beauregard Lee makes predictions from Lilburn, Georgia (later Butts County, Georgia). The University of Dallas in Irving, Texas has boasted of hosting the second largest Groundhog celebration in the world.

Canada
The day is observed with various ceremonies at other locations in North America beyond the United States.

Due to Nova Scotia's Atlantic Time Zone, Shubenacadie Sam makes the first Groundhog Day prediction in North America. "Daks Day" (from the German dachs) is Groundhog Day in the dialect of Lunenburg, Nova Scotia.

A study also shows that in Quebec, the marmot and groundhog are regarded as Candlemas weather-predicting beasts in some scattered spots, but the bear is the more usual animal.

Wiarton Willie forecasts annually from Wiarton, Ontario.

Manitoba Merv has been forecasting since the 1990s, at Oak Hammock Marsh.

Winnipeg Wyn has been forecasting since the 2010s, at Prairie Wildlife Rehabilitation Centre.

Balzac Billy is the "Prairie Prognosticator", a man-sized groundhog mascot who prognosticates weather on Groundhog Day from Balzac, Alberta.

Nanaimo a ferry port city on Vancouver Island in British Columbia, Canada present Chopper, Marlu, and Van Isle Violet, all wild Vancouver Island marmots, for forecasts, via the Marmot Recovery Foundation.

Accuracy
In Pennsylvania, Punxsutawney Phil has become a popular tradition. On February 2, people within the city will gather to find out whether or not Phil's shadow is revealed. With that, he will allegedly determine whether spring will soon begin by not seeing his shadow, or if winter will ensue for six more weeks.

Statistics
Punxsutawney Phil's statistics are kept by the Pennsylvania's Groundhog Club which cares for the animal. Phil has predicted 106 forecasts for winter and 19 for an early spring. One year he had a partial shadow, in 1942. There were 10 years where Phil's prediction was not recorded, all of which occurred in the 1880s and 1890s. There has been one year where the event was canceled (1943) due to World War II. 

Most assessments of Phil's accuracy have given an accuracy lower than would be expected with random chance. Stormfax Almanac gives Phil an estimate of 39% accuracy. Meteorologist Tim Roche of Weather Underground gives Phil an 36% accuracy rate between 1969 and 2016, a range chosen because local weather data was most reliable from 1969 onward, and a 47% accuracy record in that time span when predicting early spring. The National Centers for Environmental Information, using a basic metric of above-normal temperatures for early spring and below-normal temperatures for more winter, placed Punxsutawney Phil's accuracy at 40% for the ten-year period preceding 2019. 

The Farmer's Almanac, which itself has been known for forecasts of questionable accuracy, gives an assessment of "exactly 50 percent" accuracy. The National Geographic Society reports a 28% success rate. A Middlebury College team found that Phil's long-term analysis of temperature high/low predictions were 70% accurate, although when the groundhog predicted early spring it was usually wrong. Canadian meteorologist Cindy Day has estimated that Nova Scotia's "Shubenacadie Sam" has an accuracy rate of about 45%, compared to 25% for Wiarton Willy in Ontario.

Part of the problem with pinning down an accuracy rate for the groundhog is that what constitutes an early spring is not clearly defined. Assessments of the accuracy of other groundhogs such as Staten Island Chuck use an objective formula. In Chuck's case, a majority of days that reach  in New York City between Groundhog Day and the March equinox.

Pseudoscientific evaluation
Prediction based on an animal's behavior used to be given more credence in the past, when stores of food became scarce as winter progressed.

One theory states that the groundhog naturally comes out of hibernation in central Pennsylvania in early February because of the increasing average temperature. Under this theory, if German settlement had been centered further north, Groundhog Day would take place at a later date. However, the observed behavior of groundhogs in central New Jersey was that they mostly come out of their burrows in mid-March, regardless of Groundhog Day weather.

There are several different ways of defining when spring begins. By some common methods of doing so, the first day of spring is around March 20, which is always just under seven weeks after February 2, even in leap years. The idea of "spring arriving early" is a highly subjective notion which could arguably refer to almost anything, from several days to several weeks. 

At any rate, Groundhog Day serves as a convenient and whimsical milestone to mark the end of the darkest three months of the year, November, December, and January in the Northern Hemisphere, and bookends nicely with Halloween, the two holidays being opposite and roughly equidistant in time from the Winter Solstice, with Halloween festivities starting after sunset and taking place in the nighttime, and Groundhog Day being a celebration of sunrise and morning.

Similar customs

In Croatia and Serbia, Orthodox Christians have a tradition that on February 2 (Candlemas) or February 15 (Sretenje, The Meeting of the Lord), the bear will awaken from winter dormancy, and if it sees (meets) its own shadow in this sleepy and confused state, it will get scared and go back to sleep for an additional 40 days, thus prolonging the winter. Thus, if it is sunny on Sretenje, it is a sign that the winter is not over yet. If it is cloudy, it is a good sign that the winter is about to end.

Similarly in Germany, on the June 27, they recognize the Seven Sleepers' Day (Siebenschläfertag). If it rains that day, the rest of summer is supposedly going to be rainy. As well, in the United Kingdom, July 15 is known as St. Swithin's day. It was traditionally believed that, if it rained on that day, it would rain for the next 40 days and nights.

Popular culture
The holiday gained more prominence, particularly internationally, with the release of the 1993 comedy film Groundhog Day with Bill Murray and Andie MacDowell.  The film became the 13th highest grossing of the year, with over $70 million at the box office. Over time, the film became a cult classic and significantly increased awareness and attendance at Groundhog Day events.

The holiday's origins also plays a prominent role in the 1979 Rankin/Bass holiday special Jack Frost, where groundhog prognosticator Pardon-Me Pete's shadow is actually manipulated by Jack Frost, initially so Jack could buy more time to use his wintery magic to protect January Junction from the villain, but over the years since, has become a proper agreement between the two to give Jack more time for wintery fun in exchange for Pete getting extra hibernation time.

Notes

 References 
 Citations 

 Sources 

 
 

Further reading

 Old, W. C., and P. Billin-Frye (2004). The Groundhog Day Book of Facts and Fun. Morton Grove, IL: Albert Whitman.
 Pulling, A. F. (2001). Around Punxsutawney''. Charleston, S.C.: Arcadia.

External links

 Groundhog Days Around the World
 Official Punxsutawney Groundhog Club
 Official Punxsutawney Phil Souvenir Shop, Punxsutawney, PA.
 A Holiday for Everyone - Punxsutawney Groundhog Day Short Documentary

 
February observances
Public holidays in Canada
Public holidays in the United States
Pennsylvania culture
Pennsylvania Dutch culture
Superstitions
Weather lore
Oracular animals